The 1939 Tulsa Golden Hurricane football team represented the University of Tulsa during the 1939 college football season. In their first year under head coach Chet Benefiel, the Golden Hurricane compiled a 4–5–1 record (2–1–1 against conference opponents) and finished in third place in the Missouri Valley Conference.

Schedule

After the season

The 1940 NFL Draft was held on December 9, 1939. The following Golden Hurricane players were selected.

References

Tulsa
Tulsa Golden Hurricane football seasons
Tulsa Golden Hurricane football